Thomas Wallner (born 11 January 1965) is an Austrian windsurfer. He competed in the Division II event at the 1988 Summer Olympics.

References

1965 births
Living people
People from Gmunden
Austrian male sailors (sport)
Austrian windsurfers
Olympic sailors of Austria
Sailors at the 1988 Summer Olympics – Division II
Sportspeople from Upper Austria